The Ridgeway Hotel Historic District encompasses three buildings located just east of the town square of Monticello, Arkansas.  The centerpiece of the district is the Ridgeway Hotel, a five-story brick building built in 1930; it is the tallest, and one of the most elaborately decorated buildings in Monticello's central business district.  The district also includes 202 East Gaines Street (a similar-period brick building) and the H.M. Wilson Building.

The district was listed on the National Register of Historic Places in 2009; in 2011 the three buildings were converted into a combined senior center and housing complex.

See also
National Register of Historic Places listings in Drew County, Arkansas

References

Historic districts on the National Register of Historic Places in Arkansas
Mission Revival architecture in Arkansas
Buildings designated early commercial in the National Register of Historic Places
Hotel buildings completed in 1912
Buildings and structures in Drew County, Arkansas
1912 establishments in Arkansas
National Register of Historic Places in Drew County, Arkansas
Individually listed contributing properties to historic districts on the National Register in Arkansas